Bertholey House, is a country house  near the village of Llantrisant, in Monmouthshire, Wales. A Tudor house originally stood on the site, the home of the Kemeys family. In the 1830s, a new mansion was built, in a Neoclassical style, for Colthurst Bateman. This house was almost completely destroyed in a fire in 1905. From 1999, the mansion was restored and is again a private home. The gardens and grounds are listed on the Cadw/ICOMOS Register of Parks and Gardens of Special Historic Interest in Wales.

History
The estate at Bertholey originally belonged to a cadet branch of the Kemeys family of Kemeys Manor. John Newman, in his Gwent/Monmouthshire volume of the Pevsner Buildings of Wales notes that Edward, Lord of Kemeys, had established his family in South Wales in the early 13th century. 

In 1809, Colthurst Bateman (1780-1859) married Jane Sarah Kemeys Gardener-Kemeys, heiress to Bertholey, and they built a new house on the site. This has been attributed to George Vaughan Maddox of Monmouth, a prominent local architect. 

The house was almost totally destroyed in a fire in 1905. It was restored in 1999.

Architecture and description 
John Newman suggests that, had Bertholey survived, it would have been "one of the outstanding Neoclassical buildings in the county." It was of three storeys and five bays.

In 2022 the gardens and park were listed on the Cadw/ICOMOS Register of Parks and Gardens of Special Historic Interest in Wales. Three estate buildings are listed, all at grade II, including elements of the original house, which were used as a farmhouse after 1830, the stables, and a dovecote.

Footnotes

References

Sources

External links
 Photographic study of the ruins

Country houses in Monmouthshire
Registered historic parks and gardens in Monmouthshire
Grade II listed buildings in Monmouthshire